The Mazumbai warty frog (Callulina kisiwamsitu) is a species of frogs in the family Brevicipitidae. It is endemic to forests of the West Usambara Mountains of Tanzania where it is threatened by habitat loss. It is part of a species complex and was recognised as a separate species in 2004, having previously been included in Callulina kreffti.

Description
The females are larger than the males. The skin is densely warted and the colour is a mottling of various shades of brown and black.

Distribution and habitat
Callulina kisiwamsitu is endemic to the West Usambara Mountains in Tanzania. Much of this area has been deforested and this species is found in the remains of the forested area around Lushoto including the Mazumbai Forest Reserve, Ambangula Forest Reserve and Shume-Mugambo Forest Reserve. It is found climbing in trees and on the ground in damp forests with thick undergrowth.

Biology
Callulina kisiwamsitu is a predator and feeds on small invertebrates including bugs, grasshoppers and  millipedes.

Breeding takes place in the rainy season. The male Callulina kisiwamsitu calls from low vegetation to attract a mate. The eggs are laid on land under cover in damp places. It is believed that direct development of the young takes place with juvenile frogs hatching directly from the eggs.

Status
The IUCN Red List of Threatened Species regards this species as "endangered" as its range is small (believed to be about ) and it only occurs in one location where its habitat is being lost. Its population trend is unknown. It is not known whether its habitat is severely fragmented.

References

Callulina
Frogs of Africa
Amphibians of Tanzania
Endemic fauna of Tanzania
Amphibians described in 2004
Taxonomy articles created by Polbot